United Kingdom health law concerns the laws in the United Kingdom concerning health care and medicine, primarily administered through the National Health Service.

History

Local board of health
UK Medical Act 1876
Apothecaries Act 1815
Dentists Act 1984
Medical Act 1858
National Health Service Act 1977
Royal Commission on the NHS (1979) Cmnd 7615
National Health Service and Community Care Act 1990, NHS internal market
NHS Plan 2000 more money, and more competition
National Health Service Act 2006
Regional hospital boards (1947–1974) under the National Health Service Act 1946
Regional health authority (UK) (1974-1996), 14 RHA's since the National Health Service Reorganisation Act 1973 plus 90 area health authorities. Also community health councils (1974-2003) with local council, charity appointees were meant to meet the public
NHS Executive (1996-2002) with 8 regional offices. 
Strategic health authorities, 28 in total, and List of Primary Care Trusts in England (2001-2013). Commission for Patient and Public Involvement in Health which ran patients' forums (2003-2008) was replaced 151 local involvement networks (2008-2013) 
Clinical commissioning group under the Health and Social Care Act 2012, originally 211 CCGs, but shrinking with mergers. The Care Quality Commission (2009-today) inspects hospitals, GPs and homes, and appoints the director of Healthwatch England which organises 148 Healthwatch groups.
Healthcare in Greater Manchester
National Health Service Act 1966 (c 8) s 10 required GP remuneration to be partly linked to the number of patients they saw.
National Health Service Act 1977 (c 49)
National Health Service (Primary Care) Act 1997 (c 46)
NHS Redress Act 2006

Governance

Medical malpractice

Consent and privacy

Research

Human Fertilisation and Embryology Act 1990
Human Fertilisation and Embryology Act 2008
Human Fertilisation and Embryology Authority
Human Genetics Commission
Human Reproductive Cloning Act 2001

Mental health

Bethlem Royal Hospital

Life and death

See also
UK enterprise law

References
E Jackson, Medical Law: Texts, Cases and Materials (4th edn 2016)

Healthcare in the United Kingdom
Health law in the United Kingdom
Medical regulation in the United Kingdom